The following is the final results of the 2007–08 Premier Soccer League football season in South Africa.

Final table

Awards

PSL 
 Footballer of the Year
Teko Modise (Orlando Pirates)

 Chairman’s Award
Musa Otieno (Santos)

 Referee of the Season
Ace Ncobo

 Assistant Referee of the Season
Enoch Molefe

ABSA Premiership 
 Player of the Season
Elias Pelembe (Supersport United)

 Players’ Player of the Season
Itumeleng Khune (Kaizer Chiefs)

 Coach of the Season
Gavin Hunt (Supersport United)

 Goalkeeper of the Season
Itumeleng Khune (Kaizer Chiefs)

 Lesley Manyathela Golden Boot Award
James Chamanga (Moroka Swallows)

 Awesome Goal of the Season
Siboniso Gaxa (Supersport United) vs Mamelodi Sundowns

Nedbank Cup 
 Player of the Tournament
Vusiwe Masondo (Mpumalanga Black Aces)

 Most Promising Player of the Tournament
Thabang Rooi (Mpumalanga Black Aces)

Telkom Knockout 
 Player of the Tournament
Itumeleng Khune (Kaizer Chiefs)

Top goalscorers 

 Last updated: May 17, 2008
 Source: PSL official website

Kits 2007-2008

References

External links 
 RSSSF competition overview

2007-08
2007–08 in African association football leagues
1